A heat torch is a tool or device that is used to heat up a substance quickly, whether it is air, metal, plastic, or other materials. Heat torches typically provide a way to quickly heat a concentrated area of material for uses such as molding, metallurgy, hardening, and solidification.

Uses

Medical industry
Heat torches can be found in various medical instruments such as blood analyzers. In one application, a heat torch was installed inside a blood analyzer to make film cuvettes in real time, allowing blood to be stored and tested on board the instrument.

Jewelry making (lapidary)
Commonly referred to as a soldering torch, heat torches used in jewelry making are often fueled by butane, propane, MAPP gas, or a mixture of propane and oxygen. Heat torches are more effective at working with certain metals, such as sterling, gold, and copper, because they are able to heat these metals to a higher degree than traditional soldering irons and soldering guns.

Manufacturing and industry
Heat torches have a wide range of use in manufacturing industries such as high-capacity staking, curing, drying, heat-shrinking, air heaters, sterilization, adhesive activation, air scrubbing and air knives.

Construction
Specialized plasma heat torches can be used in construction to heat up soil, a technique that has proven to be useful for providing more solid footing for buildings and structures. This is still a developing technology, but has proven to be successful in prototype testing.

See also
 Blow torch

References

Tools